Lindsay Davenport was the defending champion, but lost in the final 7–6(7–2), 6–4 against Amélie Mauresmo.

It was the 1st title for Mauresmo in the season and the 2nd title in her career.

Seeds
The first four seeds received a bye into the second round.

Draw

Finals

Top half

Bottom half

References
 Main and Qualifying Draws

Adidas International
Adidas